William Hutchinson (1856–1880) was a rugby union international who represented England from 1876 to 1877.

Early life

Rugby union career
Hutchinson attended and played his club rugby for the Royal Indian Engineering College (Cooper's Hill). He was selected to play for England in 1876 and made his international debut on 6 March 1876 at The Oval in the England vs Scotland match. His debut was described as "a very brilliant first appearance" and he was described as a first-rate half-back, a quick starter, with a very fair amount of pace, an unselfish player, and good tackle. His second and final match was on 5 February 1877 at The Oval in the England vs Ireland match. This match was the first international to be played with fifteen a-side, making Hutchinson one of the few players to have played international matches in both 20 and 15 a-side eras. Eight minutes into the match Hutchinson ran in for a try and later scored again, making him England's record try scorer at that point.

Hutchinson's military career was to take him to India and it was this which curtailed his rugby playing career. Whilst in India, he died in 1880.

References

1856 births
1880 deaths
English rugby union players
England international rugby union players
Rugby union halfbacks
RIE College RFC players
Alumni of the Royal Indian Engineering College